Trechus algiricus is a species of ground beetle in the subfamily Trechinae. It was described by Jeannel in 1922.

References

algiricus
Beetles described in 1922